Tanja Henseler (born 18 September 1997) is a Swiss Paralympic athlete who competes in sprinting events in international level events.

References

1997 births
Living people
People with caudal regression syndrome
People from Sursee District
Paralympic athletes of Switzerland
Swiss female sprinters
Sportspeople from the canton of Lucerne